The Andalusia-Extremadura Column was a confederal militia composed of anarchist militants and workers that participated in the Spanish Civil War, on the fronts of Córdoba and Jáen.

Its organization began in Bujalance at the end of September 1936 after the Republicans lost the towns of Castro del Río and Espejo.

References 

Defunct anarchist militant groups
Spanish Revolution of 1936
Military units and formations of the Spanish Civil War
Confederal militias
Military units and formations established in 1936
Military units and formations disestablished in 1937